The Tsar Bomba (code name: Ivan or Vanya), also known by the alphanumerical designation "AN602", was a thermonuclear aerial bomb, and the most powerful nuclear weapon ever created and tested. The Soviet physicist Andrei Sakharov oversaw the project at Arzamas-16, while the main work of design was by Sakharov, Viktor Adamsky, Yuri Babayev, Yuri Smirnov, and Yuri Trutnev. The project was ordered by Nikita Khrushchev in July 1961 as part of the Soviet resumption of nuclear testing after the Test Ban Moratorium, with the detonation timed to coincide with the 22nd Congress of the Communist Party of the Soviet Union.

Tested on 30 October 1961, the test verified new design principles for high-yield thermonuclear charges, allowing, as its final report put it, the design of a nuclear device "of practically unlimited power". The detonation was monitored by United States intelligence agencies, via a KC-135A aircraft (Operation SpeedLight) in the area at the time. A secret U.S. reconnaissance aircraft named "Speed Light Alpha" monitored the blast, coming close enough to have its antiradiation paint scorched.

As they had the instrumental data and access to the test site, their yield figure has been accepted as more accurate. In theory, the bomb would have had a yield in excess of  if it had included the uranium-238 fusion tamper which featured in the design but was omitted in the test to reduce radioactive fallout. As only one bomb was built to completion, that capability has never been demonstrated. The remaining bomb casings are located at the Russian Atomic Weapon Museum in Sarov and the Museum of Nuclear Weapons, All-Russian Scientific Research Institute Of Technical Physics, in Snezhinsk.

Tsar Bomba was a modification of an earlier project, RN202, which used a ballistic case of the same size but a very different internal mechanism. A number of published books, even some authored by those involved in product development 602, contain inaccuracies that are replicated elsewhere, including wrongly identifying Tsar Bomba as RDS-202 or RN202.

Project goals 
In the mid-1950s, the United States had an unconditional superiority over the USSR in nuclear weapons, although thermonuclear charges had already been created in the USSR at this time. Also, there were no effective means of delivering nuclear warheads to the US, both in the 1950s and in 1961. The USSR was not therefore able to muster a possible realistic retaliatory nuclear strike against the US.

Given the Soviet Union's actual strategic disadvantage in relation to America's nuclear weapons possessions, foreign policy and propaganda considerations during the leaderships of Georgy Malenkov and Nikita Khrushchev made a response to the perceived US nuclear blackmail imperative. The creation of the Tsar Bomba represented a necessitated bluff in order to maintain the concept of nuclear deterrence.

Also on June 23, 1960, the Resolution of the Council of Ministers of the USSR was issued on the creation of a super-heavy ballistic missile N-1 (GRAU index – 11A52) with a warhead weighing .

The development of new designs of nuclear and thermonuclear ammunition requires testing. The operability of the device, its safety in emergency situations, and the calculated energy release during an explosion must be confirmed.

Name 
The bomb was officially known as "product 602" or "AN602", and codenamed "Ivan". The usage of different names can be a source of confusion. The Tsar Bomba, being a modification of the RN202, is sometimes mistakenly labelled as RDS-37, RDS-202 or PH202 (product 202). It has also been referred to as RDS-220 in a number of relatively recent western publications.

Unofficially, the bomb would later become known as "Tsar Bomba" and "Kuzka's mother". The name Tsar Bomba (loosely translated as Emperor of Bombs) comes from an allusion to two other Russian historical artifacts, the Tsar Cannon and the Tsar Bell, both of which were created as showpieces but whose large size made them impractical for actual use. The name "Tsar Bomba" does not seem to have been used for the weapon prior to the 1990s. The name "Kuzka's Mother" was inspired by the statement of Khrushchev to then US Vice President Richard Nixon: "We have funds at our disposal that will have dire consequences for you. We will show you Kuzka's mother!"

The Central Intelligence Agency (CIA) designated the test as "JOE 111", using their "JOE" counting scheme begun with RDS-1 in 1949.

Development 

The development of a super-powerful bomb began in 1956 and was carried out in two stages. At the first stage, from 1956 to 1958, it was "product 202", which was developed in the recently-created NII-1011. The modern name of NII-1011 is the "Russian Federal Nuclear Center or the All-Russian Scientific Research Institute of Technical Physics" (RFNC-VNIITF). According to the official history of the institute, the order on the creation of a research institute in the system of the Ministry of Medium Machine Building was signed on April 5, 1955; work at the NII-1011 began a little later.

At the second stage of development, from 1960 to a successful test in 1961, the bomb was called "item 602" and was developed at KB-11 (VNIIEF), V. B. Adamsky was developing, and besides him, the physical scheme was developed by Andrei Sakharov, Yu. N. Babaev, Yu. N. Smirnov, Yu. A. Trutnev.

Product 202 

After the creation in 1955 of the second nuclear center – NII-1011, in 1956, by a resolution of the Council of Ministers, the center was assigned the task of developing an ultra-high-power charge, which was called "Project 202".

On March 12, 1956, a draft Joint Resolution of the Central Committee of the Communist Party of the Soviet Union (CPSU Central Committee) and the Council of Ministers of the Soviet Union on the preparation and testing of the 202 product was adopted.

The Tsar Bomba differs from its parent design – the RN202 – in several places. The Tsar Bomba was a three-stage bomb with a Trutnev-Babaev second- and third-stage design, with a yield of 50 Mt. This is equivalent to about 1,570 times the combined energy of the bombs that destroyed Hiroshima and Nagasaki, 10 times the combined energy of all the conventional explosives used in World War II, one quarter of the estimated yield of the 1883 eruption of Krakatoa, and 10% of the combined yield of all other nuclear tests to date. A three-stage hydrogen bomb uses a fission bomb primary to compress a thermonuclear secondary, as in most hydrogen bombs, and then uses energy from the resulting explosion to compress a much larger additional thermonuclear stage. There is evidence that the Tsar Bomba had several third stages rather than a single very large one. RDS-202 was assembled on the principle of radiation implosion, which was previously tested during the creation of RDS-37. Since it used a much-heavier secondary module than in the RDS-37, not one, but two primary modules (charges), located on two opposite sides of the secondary module, were used to compress it. This physical charging scheme was later used in the design of the AN-602, but the AN-602 thermonuclear charge itself (secondary module) was new. The RDS-202 thermonuclear charge was manufactured in 1956, and was planned for testing in 1957, but was not tested and put into storage. Two years after the manufacture of the RDS-202, in July 1958, it was decided to remove it from storage, dismantle and use automation units and charge parts for experimental work (Order No. 277 of the Ministry of Medium Machine Building dated May 23, 1957).
The CPSU Central Committee and the Council of Ministers of the USSR adopted a draft Joint Resolution on 12 March, 1956, on the preparation and testing of izdeliye 202, which read:

Product 602 

In February 1961, the leaders of KB-11 sent a letter to the Central Committee of the CPSU with the subject line "Some questions of the development of nuclear weapons and methods of their use", which, among other things, raised the question of the expediency of developing such a 100 Mt device. On July 10, 1961, a discussion took place in the Central Committee of the CPSU, at which First Secretary Nikita Khrushchev supported the development and testing of this super-powerful bomb.

To speed up the work on Tsar Bomba, it was based on the 202 Project, but was a new project, developed by a different group. In particular, in KB-11, six casings for the Project 202 bomb already manufactured at NII-1011 and a set of equipment developed for the 202 Project testing were used.

Tsar Bomba had a "three-stage" design: the first stage is the necessary fission trigger. As a result of the thermonuclear reaction, huge numbers of high-energy fast neutrons were formed in the main thermonuclear module, which, in turn, initiated the fast fission nuclear reaction in the nuclei of the surrounding uranium-238, which would have added another 50 Mt of energy to the explosion, so that the estimated energy release of Tsar Bomba was around 100 Mt.

The test of such a complete three-stage 100 Mt bomb was rejected due to the extremely high level of radioactive contamination that would be caused by the fission reaction of large quantities of uranium-238 fission. During the test, the bomb was used in a two-stage version. A. D. Sakharov suggested using nuclear passive material instead of the uranium-238 in the secondary bomb module, which reduced the bomb's energy to 50 Mt, and, in addition to reducing the amount of radioactive fission products, avoided the fireball's contact with the Earth's surface, thus eliminating radioactive contamination of the soil and the distribution of large amounts of fallout into the atmosphere.

Many technical innovations were applied in the design of Tsar Bomba. The thermonuclear charge was made according to the "bifilar" scheme – the radiation implosion of the main thermonuclear stage was carried out from two opposite sides. These secondary charges produced X-ray compression of the main thermonuclear charge. For this, the second stage was separated into two fusion charges which were placed in the front and rear parts of the bomb, for which a synchronous detonation was required with a difference in initiation of no more than 100 nanoseconds. To ensure synchronous detonation of charges with the required accuracy, the sequencing unit of the detonation electronics was modified at KB-25 (now "Federal State Unitary Enterprise "NL Dukhov All-Russian Scientific Research Institute of Automation")(VNIIA).

Development of the carrier aircraft 

The initial three-stage design of Tsar Bomba was capable of yielding approximately 100 Mt through fast fission (3,000 times the power of the Hiroshima and Nagasaki bombs); however, it was thought that this would have resulted in too much nuclear fallout, and the aircraft delivering the bomb would not have had enough time to escape the explosion. To limit the amount of fallout, the third stage and possibly the second stage had a lead tamper instead of a uranium-238 fusion tamper (which greatly amplifies the fusion reaction by fissioning uranium atoms with fast neutrons from the fusion reaction). This eliminated fast fission by the fusion-stage neutrons so that approximately 97% of the total yield resulted from thermonuclear fusion alone (as such, it was one of the "cleanest" nuclear bombs ever created, generating a very low amount of fallout relative to its yield). There was a strong incentive for this modification, since most of the fallout from a test of the bomb would probably have descended on populated Soviet territory.

The first studies on "Topic 242" began immediately after Igor Kurchatov talked with Andrei Tupolev (then held in late 1954). Tupolev appointed his deputy for weapon systems, Aleksandr Nadashkevich, as the head of the Topic. Subsequent analysis indicated that to carry such a heavy, concentrated load, the Tu-95 bomber carrying the Tsar Bomba needed to have its engines, bomb bay, suspension and release mechanisms extensively redesigned. The Tsar Bomba's dimensional and weight drawings were passed in the first half of 1955, together with its placement layout drawing. The Tsar Bomba's weight accounted for 15% of the weight of its Tu-95 carrier as expected. The carrier, aside from having its fuel tanks and bomb bay doors removed, had its BD-206 bomb-holder replaced by a new, heavier beam-type BD7-95-242 (or BD-242) holder attached directly to the longitudinal weight-bearing beams. The problem of how to release the bomb was also solved; the bomb-holder would release all three of its locks in a synchronous fashion via electro-automatic mechanisms as required by safety protocols.

A Joint Resolution of the CPSU Central Committee and the Council of Ministers (Nr. 357-28ss) was issued on 17 March, 1956, which mandated that OKB-156 begin conversion of a Tu-95 bomber into a high-yield nuclear bomb carrier. These works were carried out in the Gromov Flight Research Institute from May to September 1956. The converted bomber, designated the Tu-95V, was accepted for duty and was handed over for flight tests which, including a release of a mock-up "superbomb", were conducted under the command of Colonel S. M. Kulikov until 1959, and passed without major issues.

Despite the creation of the Tu-95V bomb-carrier aircraft, the test of the Tsar Bomba was postponed for political reasons: namely, Khrushchev's visit to the United States and a pause in the Cold War. The Tu-95V during this period was flown to Uzyn, in today's Ukraine, and was used as a training aircraft; therefore, it was no longer listed as a combat aircraft. With the beginning of a new round of the Cold War in 1961, the test was resumed. The Tu-95V had all connectors in its automatic release mechanism replaced, the bomb bay doors removed and the aircraft itself covered with a special, reflective white paint.

In late 1961, the aircraft was modified for testing Tsar Bomba at the Kuibyshev aircraft plant.

Test 
Nikita Khrushchev, the first secretary of the Communist Party, announced the upcoming tests of a 50-Mt bomb in his opening report at the 22nd Congress of the Communist Party of the Soviet Union on October 17, 1961. Before the official announcement, in a casual conversation, he told an American politician about the bomb, and this information was published on September 8, 1961, in The New York Times. The Tsar Bomba was tested on October 30, 1961.

The Tupolev Tu-95V aircraft, No. 5800302, with the bomb took off from the Olenya airfield, and was flown to State Test Site No. 6 of the USSR Ministry of Defense located on Novaya Zemlya with a crew of nine:

 Test pilot – Major Andrei Yegorovich Durnovtsev
 Lead navigator of tests – Major Ivan Nikiforovich Kleshch
 Second pilot – Captain Mikhail Konstantinovich Kondratenko
 Navigator-operator of the radar – Lieutenant Anatoly Sergeevich Bobikov
 Radar operator – Captain Alexander Filippovich Prokopenko
 Flight engineer – Captain Grigory Mikhailovich Yevtushenko
 Radio operator – Lieutenant Mikhail Petrovich Mashkin
 Gunner-radio operator – Captain Vyacheslav Mikhailovich Snetkov
 Gunner-radio operator – Corporal Vasily Yakovlevich Bolotov

The test was also attended by the Tupolev Tu-16 laboratory aircraft, no. 3709, equipped for monitoring the tests, and its crew:

 Leading test pilot – Lieutenant Colonel Vladimir Fyodorovich Martynenko
 Second pilot – Senior Lieutenant Vladimir Ivanovich Mukhanov
 Leading navigator – Major Semyon Artemievich Grigoryuk
 Navigator-operator of the radar – Major Vasily Timofeevich Muzlanov
 Gunner-radio operator – Senior Sergeant Mikhail Emelyanovich Shumilov

Both aircraft were painted with special reflective paint to minimize heat damage. Despite this effort, Durnovtsev, and his crew, were given only a 50% chance of surviving the test.

The Tu-95V dropped  in the air because of the shock wave but was able to recover and land safely.

Although simplistic fireball calculations predicted it would be large enough to hit the ground, the bomb's own shock wave bounced back and prevented this.

A Soviet cameraman said: The clouds beneath the aircraft and in the distance were lit up by the powerful flash. The sea of light spread under the hatch and even clouds began to glow and became transparent. At that moment, our aircraft emerged from between two cloud layers and down below in the gap a huge bright orange ball was emerging. The ball was powerful and arrogant like Jupiter. Slowly and silently it crept upwards ... Having broken through the thick layer of clouds it kept growing. It seemed to suck the whole Earth into it. The spectacle was fantastic, unreal, supernatural."

Test results 
The explosion of Tsar Bomba, according to the classification of nuclear explosions, was an ultra-high-power low-air nuclear explosion.

It was observed in Norway, Greenland and Alaska.
The cloud was observed  from the explosion site.
 The blast wave circled the globe three times, with the first one taking 36 hours and 27 minutes.
 A seismic wave in the earth's crust, generated by the shock wave of the explosion, circled the globe three times.
 Glass shattered in windows  from the explosion in a village on Dikson Island.
 The sound wave generated by the explosion reached Dikson Island, but there are no reports of destruction or damage to structures even in the urban-type settlement of Amderma, which is much closer to the landfall.
 Ionization of the atmosphere caused interference to radio communications even hundreds of kilometers from the test site for about 40 minutes. 
The testers appeared at the explosion site 2 hours later; radioactive contamination posed practically no danger to the test participants.

In districts hundreds of kilometres from ground zero, wooden houses were destroyed; stone ones lost their roofs, windows, and doors; and radio communications were interrupted for almost one hour. Atmospheric focusing caused blast damage at even greater distances, breaking windows in Norway and Finland.

Reactions
Immediately after the test, several US Senators condemned the Soviet Union. Prime Minister of Sweden Tage Erlander saw the blast as the Soviets' answer to a personal appeal to halt nuclear testing that he had sent the Soviet leader in the week prior to the blast. The British Foreign Office, Prime Minister of Norway Einar Gerhardsen, Prime Minister of Denmark Viggo Kampmann and others also released statements condemning the blast. Soviet and Chinese radio stations mentioned the US underground nuclear test of a much smaller bomb (possibly the Mink test) carried out the day prior, without mentioning the Tsar Bomba test.

Consequences of the test 

The creation and testing of a superbomb were of great political importance; the Soviet Union demonstrated its potential in creating a nuclear arsenal of great power (at that time, the most powerful thermonuclear charge tested by the United States was 15 Mt (Castle Bravo)). After the Tsar Bomba test, the United States did not increase the power of its own thermonuclear tests and, in 1963 in Moscow, the Treaty Banning Nuclear Weapon Tests in the Atmosphere, Outer Space and Under Water was signed.

The scientific result of the test was the experimental verification of the principles of calculation and design of multistage thermonuclear charges. It was experimentally proven that there is no fundamental limitation on increasing the power of a thermonuclear charge. However, as early as October 30, 1949, three years before the Ivy Mike test which utilized the Teller-Ulam design, in the Supplement to the official report of the General Advisory Committee of the US Atomic Energy Commission, nuclear physicists Enrico Fermi and Isidor Isaac Rabi observed that thermonuclear weapons have "unlimited destructive power". In the tested specimen of the bomb, to raise the explosion power by another 50 Mt, it was enough to replace the lead sheath with uranium-238, as was normally expected. The replacement of the cladding material and the decrease in the explosion power were motivated by the desire to reduce the amount of radioactive fallout to an acceptable level, and not by the desire to reduce the weight of the bomb, as is sometimes believed. The weight of Tsar Bomba did decrease from this, but insignificantly. The resulting relief of just over one ton is weakly noticeable with a total mass of Tsar Bomba of at least 24 tons and did not affect the state of affairs with its transportation.

The explosion is one of the cleanest in the history of atmospheric nuclear tests per unit of power. The first stage of the bomb was a uranium charge with a capacity of 1.5 Mt, which in itself provided a large amount of radioactive fallout; nevertheless, it can be assumed that Tsar Bomba was really relatively clean – more than 97% of the explosion power was provided by a thermonuclear fusion reaction, which practically does not create radioactive contamination.

A distant consequence was the increased radioactivity accumulated in the glaciers of Novaya Zemlya. According to the 2015 expedition, due to nuclear tests, the glaciers of Novaya Zemlya are 65–130 times more radioactive than the background in neighboring areas, including contamination from the tests of the Kuzka's Mother.

Sakharov was against nuclear proliferation, and played a key role in signing the 1963 Partial Test Ban Treaty. Sakharov became an advocate of civil liberties and reforms in the Soviet Union. These efforts earned him the Nobel Peace Prize in 1975.

Analysis 

The Tsar Bomba is the single most physically powerful device ever deployed on Earth, the most powerful nuclear bomb tested and the largest man-made explosion in history.

The weight and size of the Tsar Bomba limited the range and speed of the specially-modified bomber carrying it. Delivery by an intercontinental ballistic missile would have required a much stronger missile (the Proton started its development as that delivery system). It has been estimated that detonating the original 100 Mt design would have released fallout amounting to about 26% of all fallout emitted since the invention of nuclear weapons. It was decided that a full 100 Mt detonation would create a nuclear fallout that was unacceptable in terms of pollution from a single test, as well as a near-certainty that the release plane and crew would be destroyed before it could escape the blast radius.

The Tsar Bomba was the culmination of a series of high-yield thermonuclear weapons designed by the Soviet Union and the United States during the 1950s (e.g., the Mark 17 and B41 nuclear bombs).

Practical applications 
Tsar Bomba was never a practical weapon; it was a single product, the design of which allowed reaching a power of 100 Mt TE. The test of a 50-Mt bomb was, among other things, a test of the performance of the product design for 100 Mt. The bomb was intended exclusively to exert psychological pressure on the United States.

Experts began to develop military missiles for warheads (150 Mt and more) that have been redirected for space use:
 UR-500 – (warhead mass – 40 tons, virtually implemented as a carrier rocket – "Proton" – GRAU index – 8K82)
 N-1 – (warhead mass – , the development was reoriented into a carrier for the lunar program, the project was brought to the stage of flight design tests and closed in 1976, GRAU index – 11A52)
 R-56 – (GRAU index – 8K67)

Films 
Footage from a Soviet documentary about the bomb is featured in Trinity and Beyond: The Atomic Bomb Movie (Visual Concept Entertainment, 1995), where it is referred to as the Russian monster bomb. The video states that the Tsar Bomba project broke the voluntary moratorium on nuclear tests. In fact, the Soviets restarted their tests and broke the unilateral voluntary moratorium 30 days before Tsar Bomba, testing 45 times in that month. Since the moratorium was unilateral there was no multilateral legal obstacle. The US had declared their own one-year unilateral moratorium on nuclear tests and, as that year had expired, the US had already announced that it considered itself free to resume testing without further notice. Later, it was stated that the US had not resumed testing at the time of the Tsar Bomba test. That announcement was in error, as the US had in fact tested five times under Operation Nougat between the USSR's ending of the moratorium on 1 October and the Tsar Bomba test on 30 October.
"World's Biggest Bomb", a 2011 episode of the PBS documentary series Secrets of the Dead produced by Blink Films & WNET, chronicles the events leading to the detonations of Castle Bravo and the Tsar Bomba.
In connection with the celebration of 75 years of nuclear industry, Rosatom released a declassified Russian language documentary video of the Tsar Bomba test on YouTube in August 2020.

See also 

 Cold War
 Castle Bravo – largest US Test, and second largest detonation by MT
 Father of All Bombs – largest Russian conventional bomb
 Soviet atomic bomb project
 Doomsday device

References

External links 
 
 
  

1961 in military history
1961 in science
1961 in the Soviet Union
Explosions in 1961
Cold War weapons of the Soviet Union
Novaya Zemlya
Nuclear bombs of the Soviet Union
Russian inventions
Soviet inventions
Soviet nuclear weapons testing
October 1961 events